Pamela Studstill (born 1954) is an American quilter considered to be a part of the contemporary "art quilt" movement. The recipient of two NEA fellowships,

Collections
Studstill's work is included in the collections of the Smithsonian American Art Museum, the International Quilt Museum at the University of Nebraska–Lincoln and the National Quilt Museum.

References

1954 births
American quilters
20th-century American women artists
21st-century American women artists
Artists from San Antonio
Artists in the Smithsonian American Art Museum collection
Living people